Pteroglossa is a genus of flowering plants from the orchid family, Orchidaceae. It is native to South America, Central America, and Mexico.

Pteroglossa euphlebia (Rchb.f.) Garay - Rio de Janeiro
Pteroglossa glazioviana (Cogn.) Garay - Brazil, Paraguay
Pteroglossa hilariana (Cogn.) Garay - Brazil
Pteroglossa lurida (M.N.Correa) Garay - Brazil, Paraguay, Argentina
Pteroglossa luteola Garay - Argentina
Pteroglossa macrantha (Rchb.f.) Schltr.  - Brazil, Paraguay, Venezuela
Pteroglossa magnifica Szlach. - Paraguay
Pteroglossa regia (Kraenzl.) Schltr. - Argentina
Pteroglossa rhombipetala Garay - Paraguay, Argentina
Pteroglossa roseoalba (Rchb.f.) Salazar & M.W.Chase - widespread from Oaxaca to Argentina

See also 
 List of Orchidaceae genera

References

External links 
 
 

Cranichideae genera
Spiranthinae